Sir John Adams Hunter, KCMG (30 Oct. 1890 – 17 November 1962) was a British colonial administrator. He was the Governor of British Honduras from 1940 to 1946 and -1947.

See also 

 List of colonial governors and administrators of British Honduras

References 

 https://www.ukwhoswho.com/view/10.1093/ww/9780199540891.001.0001/ww-9780199540884-e-53416

1890 births
1962 deaths
Governors of British Honduras
Knights Commander of the Order of St Michael and St George